St Nicholas' Church, Ipswich is a medieval church in Ipswich. It is currently used by the Diocese of St Edmundsbury & Ipswich as a conference centre and is adjacent to the diocesan offices, and the bishops' offices. The church dates from 1300 and was substantially refitted in 1849. The fifteenth century tower was rebuilt in 1886.

St Nicholas Parish
St Nicholas was a parish church and in the late medieval times this parish was part of Ipswich south ward, along with the parish of St Peters.

Bells
The church has a ring of 5 bells all but the 2nd were cast by Henry Pleasant of Sudbury in 1706. The second was cast by Miles I Graye of Colchester in 1630. All 5 bells hang in oak frame dating from c.1706.

Notable people buried in St Nicholas' graveyard
 Peyton Ventris (1645 – 1691), judge and politician.

References

Church of England church buildings in Ipswich
Grade II* listed buildings in Ipswich